is a Japanese actress and model.

Early life 
Takahashi was born in Ōtsu, Shiga, to a Filipino mother and a Japanese father. She won the Grand Prix in a female vocal audition in 2006 held by the TV Tokyo show Output.

Career

Modelling career 
Takahashi is represented by the Asia Promotion talent agency. She started her career as an exclusive model for the Cawaii! magazine and her first photo book, Yu, was released in 2008. After that, she was an exclusive model for the Pinky magazine until 2009.

Acting career 
She appeared regularly in the NHK Educational TV television program Kyō Kara Eikaiwa in 2007. As an actress, she played Yuri Aso in TV Asahi's Kamen Rider Kiva and starred in the 2008 film version, Kamen Rider Kiva: King of the Castle in the Demon World. She played a leading role in the 2012 film, Brand Guardians, with South Korean actor Yoon Shi-yoon. In 2013, she played the role of Makoto/Sailor Jupiter in a musical remake of Sailor Moon: La Reconquista and in 2014 in musical Sailor Moon: Petite Étrangère.

Personal life 
She is the younger sister of Maryjun Takahashi, who is also a model and actress. She also has a brother who is a professional football player named Yuji Takahashi.

In October 2018, she married K-1 fighter Hirotaka Urabe.

On 22 September 2019, she announced that she was pregnant, and had given birth to a baby boy on 28 January 2020.

On 28 June 2022, she announced that she was pregnant with her second child, and had given birth to a baby boy on 2 December of the same year.

Appearances

Films 
 Kamen Rider Kiva: King of the Castle in the Demon World (2008), Yuri Asō
 Brand Guardians (2012)
 Stolen Identity 2 (2020)

TV dramas 
 Kamen Rider Kiva (TV Asahi, 2008-2009), Yuri Asō
 Shinigami-kun Episode 6 (TV Asahi, 2014), Sayaka Kirino
 Kono Mystery ga Sugoi!: Best Seller Sakka Kara no Chōsenjō (TBS, 2014), Mutsumi Sakashita
 Kageriyuku Natsu (WOWOW, 2015), Sachiko Haruki
 Mondai no Aru Restaurant Episode 2 (Fuji TV, 2015)
 Kamen Rider Zi-O (TV Asahi, 2019), Sougo Tokiwa's true first love, "Ms. Sailor"

Stage

 Pu-Pu-Juice Pani☆Hosu (August 2013)
 Sailor Moon musicals (AiiA Theater Tokyo, 13 September 2013 - 2015), Sailor Jupiter
 Sonezaki Shinjū (September 2013)
 WBB Vol.6 Soshite, Konya mo Nikolaschka! (June 2014)

Events

 Kansai Collection (2014 S/S, 2014 A/W, 2015 S/S)
 Tokyo Girls Collection (2011 A/W, 2012 A/W)
 Girls Award (2010 S/S, 2010 A/W, 2011 A/W, 2012 A/W)

Bibliography

Magazines
 Pinky, Shueisha 2004-2009, as an exclusive model until 2009
 Cawaii!, Shufunotomo 1996-2009, as an exclusive model from 2006 to 2009

Photobook
 Yu (Saibunkan Publishing, September 2008)

Awards 
 The 68th Agency for Cultural Affairs Japan Arts Festival (2013): Best Newcomer
 The 3rd Best Engagement 2015: Won (Family Category)

References

External links 
 Official blog (Ameba) 
 Official Google+ Update 
 Asia Promotion agency profile 
 Mammoth agency profile 

Japanese female models
21st-century Japanese actresses
1991 births
Living people
Japanese people of Filipino descent
People from Ōtsu, Shiga
Models from Shiga Prefecture